Cho Min-hye (born February 7, 1987), also known as mi:ne, is a South Korean singer.

Discography

Albums 
 Teenage Superstar, August 18, 2006

Digital Singles 
 White Dream, December 20, 2006

Soundtracks 
 기다릴게 (투니버스 애니메이션 OST) [Digital Single] [I'll Wait (Tooniverse Animations OST)], January 23, 2007

Videography

Music Videos

Sources 
 조민혜 in Daum
 조민혜 in soribada
 조민혜 in last.fm
 조민혜 in iTunes

South Korean women pop singers
1986 births
Living people
K-pop singers
21st-century South Korean singers
21st-century South Korean women singers